The Wong K. Gew Mansion is a historic house located at 345 W. Clay St. in Stockton. The mansion was the home of Wong K. Gew, a Chinese immigrant and a successful gambler and proprietor of gaming houses. When Wong built his home in 1921, anti-Asian laws required that he build his home south of Main Street. The mansion was designed by Losekann and Clowdsley in a mainly Federal Revival style typical of large houses of the era. The design included a veranda and a second-floor balcony on the front of the house, boxed cornices with brackets and friezes on the eaves and walls, and three gabled dormers; the interior of the house includes a fireplace with a $2,200 Yum Nan marble mantle.

The Wong K. Gew Mansion was added to the National Register of Historic Places on September 20, 1978.

References

Houses on the National Register of Historic Places in California
Houses completed in 1921
Buildings and structures in Stockton, California
Chinese-American culture in California
Houses in San Joaquin County, California
National Register of Historic Places in San Joaquin County, California